Elgin is one of three stations on Metra's Milwaukee District West Line in Elgin, Illinois. In Metra's zone-based fare system, Elgin is in zone H. As of 2018, Elgin is the 116th busiest of Metra's 236 non-downtown stations, with an average of 411 weekday boardings.

As of December 12, 2022, Elgin is served by 44 trains (22 in each direction) on weekdays, by all 24 trains (12 in each direction) on Saturdays, and by all 18 trains (nine in each direction) on Sundays and holidays. All weekend trains originate and terminate here, in addition to three inbound trains originating from here on weekdays.

The station was built by The Milwaukee Road and was a stop on numerous intercity trains, such as the Midwest Hiawatha, Arrow, and Southwest Limited. It was also the terminus station for by more frequent commuter trains to Chicago Union Station, until Metra took over service. 

The Elgin Metra station was to also serve as a stop on the revival of Black Hawk Amtrak service between Chicago, Rockford and Dubuque, Iowa, that was supposed to begin in 2015, but has since been put on hold for further review by IDOT by Governor Bruce Rauner, and it is unknown whether it will proceed. The original proposal for the route was to have a station in South Elgin. The station is served by twelve Pace bus routes.

Notable places nearby
Fox River Trolley Museum 
Pace Elgin Transportation Center

Bus connections
Pace

References

External links 

Station House from Google Maps Street View

Elgin, Illinois
Metra stations in Illinois
Former Chicago, Milwaukee, St. Paul and Pacific Railroad stations
Future Amtrak stations in the United States
Transportation buildings and structures in Kane County, Illinois
Railway stations in the United States opened in 1947